Northeast Yucai School is an educational institute in Shenyang, China, offering education from kindergarten to pre-university (senior high) level.

NEYC has eight campuses in Shenyang City.

History 
1927 to 1932 The school was an annex of Manchurian Special Educational School.
1933 to 1945 The school was an institute called Fengtian Chiyoda Primary School (Chinese 奉天 千代田 小学 fèng-tiān qiān-dài-tián xiǎo-xué; Japanese: 奉天の千代田小学校). The name Chiyoda is due to the name of a major road nearby. The school was aimed at the children who were the offspring of immigrants from Japan during World War II.
Aug 1945 to 1946 The Republic of China government recovered Fengtian from Japan and renamed the road this school is named after "Zhong Hua Road". The school closed on July 15, 1946 and the Japanese students moved back to Japan. They later established the Chiyoda Primary School Alumni Association (Japanese: 奉天千代田小学校同窓会).
1947 to 1948 After the People's Republic of China took over, the school was renamed Arts and Sciences School. It accepted students from Changbai Normal School briefly, who moved to Fushun later.
1949 to 1955 On May 1, 1949, Northeast Yucai School was established by proletarian revolutionists headed by Zhang Wentian and Xu Teli. The school was an institute children of members of the Chinese Communist Party with positions in the Army, Communist Party or the government of Northeastern China.
1985 till now It is known as Northeast Yucai School.

Community 
NEYC serves the education needs of Shenyang City. The city is the economic and political center of northeast China, with a population of 7.9 million. The school has eight campuses with a K-6, 7–9, 10-12 grade-level configuration and an enrollment of nearly 10,000 students.

School 
NEYC (main campus, the high school division) is a six-year public high school enrolling students in grades 7 through 12. Fully accredited by the Provincial Education Department of Liaoning, NEYC is one of the key high schools in Liaoning Province.

NEYC established the Group Education patterns “Varieties of main body, Go in different ways, Chancellor’s accountability, Autonomous schooling.”

Campuses

North Campus
No. 100 Nanyi Road, Heping District, Shenyang
 Junior High Division

South Campus
No. 2 Gaogong Road, Hunnan New District, Shenyang
 Senior High Division
 Primary School Division
 International Division
 Math and Science Senior High Division
 Talented Experimental School Division
 Northeast Yucai Kindergarten
 Northeast Yucai Foreign Language School, No. 1 Gaorong Road, Hunnan new District, Shenyang

Huishan Campus
No. 200 Shenbei Road, Shenbei New District, Shenyang
  Northeast Yucai Bilingual Kindergarten
  Northeast Yucai Bilingual Primary School
  Northeast Yucai Bilingual Junior High School
  Northeast Yucai Bilingual Senior High School

Fushun Campus
No. 1 Yucai St, Shenfu New City, Fushun
  Northeast Yucai Experimental Kindergarten
  Northeast Yucai Experimental Primary School
  Northeast Yucai Experimental Junior High School
  Northeast Yucai Experimental Senior High School
  Northeast Yucai International High School (NYO)

Beihong Campus
No. 56 Hushitai South Ave, Shenbei New District, Shenyang
  Northeast Yucai Beihong School of Fine Arts

Dongguan Campus
No. 12 Yucai Xiang, Dongshuncheng South Street, Dadong District, Shenyang
 Gifted Division

Presidents 
 Li Liqun (李立群 Lǐ Lì-qún) (December 26, 1919– ) is the first president of the school. Her husband Gao Gang (高岗) was the chief party secretary and government leader of Manchuria (Northeastern China) from 1949 to 1952.
1985 - 2001 Ge Chaoding (葛朝鼎 Gě Cháo-dǐng)
2001 - 2007 Su Wenjie (苏文捷 Sū Wén-jié), director of the Bureau of Education of Shenyang
2007 - now Gao Chen (高琛 Gāo Chēn)

Faculty 
There are about 600 teachers in NEYC, 99.4% of whom have earned a bachelor's degree in national normal universities. More than 120 graduated from or are in a postgraduate course. About 100 teachers have been to the US, the UK, Australia, France, New Zealand, Canada and Japan to have professional improvement.

Experts and professors have been invited to be part-time teachers, among whom 15 persons have served the school for more than one year, including nine professors and research fellows, and four doctors. About 25 foreign teachers have been invited to work in the school each term.

Curriculum
Each school year consists of two semesters with courses and subjects depending on the grade.

All students in the senior high school division (grades 10 to 12) have courses in Chinese Language, Math (including algebra, geometry and basic calculus), English Language, Physics, Chemistry, Biology, History, Geography, Economics, and Philosophy. All science courses include lab courses and lectures.

Four times a week students have elective courses. There are almost 35 elective courses in grades 9 through 11, such as Computer science, Pottery, Theatre and Drama, Chinese traditional painting, Art History and Appreciation.

Science Accelerated Programs are offered in Maths, Physics, Chemistry, Biology and Computer Science. Specialized Classes include Japanese Language, French Language, English Language, and Advanced Level Mathematics.

German section
The school includes a section for German students. BMW Brilliance Automotive Ltd. and NYS jointly held the 2010 grand opening ceremony.

Notable alumni 
Zhou Enlai, the first Premier of the PRC and the first Foreign Minister of the PRC

References

External links 
 http://www.neyc.cn/Index.html Website

Other major schools that use the name "Yu Cai"

Schools in Liaoning
Education in Shenyang
High schools in Liaoning